Juan Martín Hernández (born August 7, 1982, in Buenos Aires) is a retired Argentine rugby union player. A mainstay of the Argentina national team The Pumas. He played for the club Toulon in the French Top 14 competition. His 2010 move to Racing brought him back to the city where he had begun his professional career in 2003 with Stade Français. Hernández is a "utility back" capable of playing at fly-half, centre, or fullback, though he generally prefers fly-half.

Hernández made his test debut for Los Pumas against Paraguay in April 2003. Since then he has accumulated over 50 caps for his national team. He retired in April 2018 following a knee injury.

Family
His uncle Patricio Hernández was part of the Argentine football squad for the 1982 FIFA World Cup.

His sister María de la Paz Hernández, won the silver medal with the Argentina field hockey team at the 2000 Summer Olympics, bronze medals at the 2004 and 2008 Summer Olympics and the World Cup in 2002.

Career

Club
Hernández began his rugby career at the amateur club Deportiva Francesa in Buenos Aires. In 2003, he moved to Paris to play professionally for Stade Français, one of the top clubs in France and Europe. He saw considerable success with Stade Français; winning the domestic championship in 2004, as well as being runners-up in the domestic championship and the European Heineken Cup in 2005. In 2006, he was named fullback of the year. This award has coincided with many commentators naming Hernández as the world's best fullback.

He took on a coaching role at the club's academy, helping young players at grass roots level.

In December 2009, the French rugby magazine Midi Olympique reported that Hernández had signed a deal with Paris' other Top 14 club, Racing Métro, and would return to France after the 2010 Super 14 season.

In early January 2010, it was announced that Hernández would be sidelined for at least 6 months following a back operation. He thus played no part in the Sharks 2010 Super 14 campaign.

International
Hernández made his debut for Argentina against Paraguay on 27 April 2003. Appearing in the starting line up, he helped the Pumas to a 144–0 victory. Following a further five Tests for Argentina in May, June and August 2003, Hernández was included in Argentina's squad for the 2003 Rugby World Cup. He came on in the opening game of the tournament against the Wallabies, as well as starting in the games against Namibia and Romania.

Following the 2003 World Cup, Hernández next played for Argentina in November 2004, starting against France, Ireland and the Springboks. He earned another three Test caps on the November tour the following season. He was then capped twice against Wales and once against the All Blacks.

Hernández was unexpectedly picked at outside half for the opening game of the 2007 Rugby World Cup against France on 7 September 2007. His scintillating form, particularly with the boot, kept him as first choice in that position during Argentina's run to the semi-finals, and he subsequently scored three drop goals in the pool match with Ireland and another in the quarter final victory over Scotland.

Hernández was nominated by the IRB as one of the five candidates for the 2007 International Player of the Year award, which was won by Bryan Habana.

Before the 2011 Rugby World Cup, Hernández was named on a list of candidates for the greatest fly half in Rugby World Cup history.

The Pumas wouldn't need to delay long to battle their southern hemisphere competitors while they were contained in the Tri-Places for that start of the 2012 Rugby Title. After a remarkable time for Rushing Neighborhood, Hernandez was back to his greatest and appeared set-to enjoy a key position in the contest for that Pumas.

Hernández was part of the national squad that competes in the Rugby Championship.

He was part of the national squad that competed at the 2015 Rugby World Cup.

Statistics

Tests
 2009: 6/6 vs. England; 13/6 vs. England
 2008: 28/6 vs. Italy; 8/11 vs. France; 15/8 vs. Italy
 2007 (all Rugby World Cup): 7/9 vs. France, 11/9 vs. Georgia; 30/9 vs. Ireland; 7/10 vs. Scotland (QF); 14/10 vs. South Africa (SF); 19/10 vs. France (3rd place)
 2006: 17/6 vs. Wales; 24/6 vs. New Zealand; 11/11 vs. England; 18/11 vs. Italy; 25/11 vs. France (1 try)
 2005: 5/11 vs. South Africa; 12/11 vs. Scotland]; 19/11 vs. Italy
 2004: 20/11: vs. France; 27/11: vs. Ireland; 4/12: vs. South Africa
 2003: 27/4: vs. Paraguay; 3/5: vs. Uruguay; 14/6: vs. France; 20/6: vs. France (1 try); 28/6: vs. South Africa (1 try); 30/8 vs. Canada. Rugby World Cup: 10/10: vs. Australia; 14/10: vs. Namibia; 22/10: vs. Romania (2 tries)

Tours
 2009: England (first June Test, originally scheduled for Argentina but moved by the national federation to Old Trafford)
 2008: Italy & France
 2007: England (vs Northampton and Leicester)
 2006: England, Italy & France
 2005: Scotland & Italy
 2004: France & Ireland
 2003: South Africa - Australia Rugby World Cup
 2002: Italy & Ireland

Honours
 Stade Français
Top 14: 2003–04, 2006–07

References

External links 
 Juan Martín Hernández at UAR.com.ar
 Stade Français

Juan Martin Hernandez “El Mago” in story life
VIDEO: Incredible banana-swerve kick vs the All Blacks in 2012

1982 births
Living people
Rugby union players from Buenos Aires
Argentine people of Spanish descent
Argentine rugby union players
Argentine expatriate sportspeople in France
Argentine expatriate sportspeople in South Africa
Rugby union fly-halves
Rugby union fullbacks
Racing 92 players
Stade Français players
RC Toulonnais players
Argentina international rugby union players
Sharks (Currie Cup) players
Jaguares (Super Rugby) players
Argentine expatriate rugby union players
Expatriate rugby union players in France
Expatriate rugby union players in South Africa
Argentina international rugby sevens players